Avalanche Rocks is a vertical rock outcrop rising to , midway between Delay Point and Jones Rocks on the west side of Melba Peninsula, Antarctica. It was discovered in September 1912 by the Australasian Antarctic Expedition under Douglas Mawson, and so named because of the occurrence of a tremendous avalanche while members of the expedition were encamped nearby.

References
 

Rock formations of Queen Mary Land